C12orf29 is a protein that in humans is encoded by chromosome 12 open reading frame 29. The gene is ubiquitously expressed in various tissues. The protein has 325 amino acids. The biological process of C12orf29 has been annotated as hematopoietic progenitor cell differentiation. The molecular and cellular functions of C12orf29 gene have not yet well understood by the scientific community.

Research suggested that C12orf29 is a potential structural protein in skeletal tissue with a role in the extracellular matrix of articular and growth cartilage. It has increased expression in osteosarcoma (OS) tumor cells and other tumor cells, and it could be a potential biomarker for detecting osteosarcoma.

Gene 
C12orf29 gene in human is located on the positive strand at 12q21.32 (p = short arm, q = long arm). It has 7 exons and 6 introns. The gene spans from 88,035,536 to 88,050,160 with 14,645 base pairs. There is only one isoform of the transcript, which is the transcript of this gene itself.

Neighbor genes around human C12orf29 are:  C12orf50 (-), RNA5SP364 (+), LOC107984542 (-), LOC100420011 (+), CEP290 (-).

Expression 
C12orf29 gene is ubiquitously expressed in 27 tissues. It is expressed a little bit higher in esophagus, skin, brain and bone marrow. It showed increased expression in several tumor cells and tissues such as in colorectal tumor tissue, in ovarian cancer epithelial cells, and in hyperplastic enlarged lobular units epithelial cells.

Protein 
C12orf29 protein has 325 amino acids. The molecular weight is 37.5 kD, and the isoelectric point is 6.6 pH. It is not a membrane protein, and it stays in the cytosol. For the content of the amino acids, compared with other human proteins, C12orf29 is high in asparagine and histidine, but it is low in alanine. There are no validated domains or motifs. It has a short repetitive structures of "INGNP", but it is not conserved in orthologs. However, there are two highly conserved predicted motifs. They are the protease caspase 3 and 7 cleavage motif, and the mitogen-activated protein kinase (MAPK) docking motif. There are several predicted protein kinase c phosphorylation sites and casein kinase II phosphorylation sites, but they are not conserved in orthologs. 
          1  MKRLGSVQRK MPCVFVTEVK EEPSSKREHQ PFKVLATETV SHKALDADIY SAIPTEKVDG 
         61  TCCYVTTYKD QPYLWARLDR KPNKQAEKRF KNFLHSKENP KEFFWNVEED FKPAPECWIP 
        121  AKETEQINGN PVPDENGHIP GWVPVEKNNK QYCWHSSVVN YEFEIALVLK HHPDDSGLLE 
        181  ISAVPLSDLL EQTLELIGTN INGNPYGLGS KKHPLHLLIP HGAFQIRNLP SLKHNDLVSW 
        241  FEDCKEGKIE GIVWHCSDGC LIKVHRHHLG LCWPIPDTYM NSRPVIINMN LNKCDSAFDI 
        301  KCLFNHFLKI DNQKFVRLKD IIFDV

Protein interaction 
NCL and LRRK2 was experimentally determined to interacted with C12orf29. NCL physically interacted with C12orf29, and LRRK2 was associated with C12orf29. There are several predicted protein interactions for C12orf29. C12orf50, C1orf186/RHEX, TOR4A, FAM171A1 are associated with C12orf29 by text-mining, and the specific type of interaction was not studied yet. The interactions with PNN, OTUD68, and ACTR6 were predicted by co-expression.

Homology and evolution 
Orthologs of C12orf29 protein are found within the mammals, birds, reptiles, amphibians, fishes, and invertebrates. The length and contents of the protein sequence was highly conserved in the selected orthologs (table below). It is important to notice that the C12orf29 protein was only found in mollusks, tunicate, and cephalochordata in invertebrates, but it was not found in insects, arachnids, crustaceans, corals, worms, jellyfishes, sponges within the other groups in invertebrates. C12orf29 protein was not found in bacteria, fungi, and viruses. There is no paralog for C12orf29 protein. The mutation rate of C12orf29 was close to that of fibrinogen alpha chain. The human’s C12orf29 protein was more closely related to the sheep’s ortholog than to the mouse’s ortholog. The invertebrates C12orf29 orthologs were mostly distantly related to the human protein.

Ortholog table

In research

In bone 
In sheep (Ovis aries) bone, C12orf29 protein has a high expression in mandible osteoblasts cells (mOB cells) and periodontal ligament cells (PDLCs). It has a relatively low but still noticeable amount of expression in prostate cancer cell line (PC3). It is observed to be expressed in the extracellular matrix (ECM) around the mOB cells, and it is suggested that C12orf29 protein is imported and embedded into ECM from mOB cells. C12orf29 are also discovered in the area around mineralization zone of the growth plate and calcified cartilage of trabecular bone in rats. C12orf29 is a potential structural protein in skeletal tissue with a role in the extracellular matrix of articular and growth cartilage. It might be decorated with glycosaminoglycans, thus a potential proteoglycan.

Cancer 
C12orf29 is expressed in the most common subtypes (osteoblastic type, mixed osteoblastic/chondroblastic type, and chondroblastic type) of osteosarcoma (OS) patients and humanized OS model. It has a role in promoting the development of the musculoskeletal system. C12orf29 has a significantly high expression in the tumor cells, but its expression is not associated with the proliferation of the tumors. OS located at the jaw or temporal regions has a statistically significant expression of C12orf29 than OS in the extremity or trunk region. C12orf29 expression has a strong positive correlation with the expression of Ki67 gene (a biomarker for tumor proliferation).

KLF9 
The mRNA expression of C12orf29 protein is increased with Krüppel-like factor 9 (KLF9) suppression.KLF9 is a transcriptional regulator of uterine endometrial cell proliferation, adhesion, and differentiation, which are essential processes for pregnancy success. KLF9 expression is suppressed during tumorigenesis.

References